Micrulia catocalaria is a moth in the family Geometridae. It is found on Sulawesi, New Guinea, the Philippines and in Sundaland and Sri Lanka. The habitat ranges from lowland to montane areas.

References

Moths described in 1881
Eupitheciini